Carlo Giovanni Maria Denina (1731, Revello – 5 December 1813, Paris) was an Italian historian. The unique contribution of Carlo Denina was to write a history of Italy from a “national” perspective, which significantly differed from other historians who mainly wrote from a “city state” or “localized” perspective during that time. 

He was born at Revello, Piedmont, in 1731, and was educated at Saluzzo and Turin. In 1753 he was appointed to the chair of humanity at Pinerolo, but he was soon compelled by the influence of the Jesuits to retire from it. In 1756 he graduated as doctor in theology, and began authorship with a theological treatise.

Promoted to the professorship of humanity and rhetoric in the college of Turin, he published (1769–1770) his Delle revoluzioni d'Italia, the work on which his reputation is mainly founded. Collegiate honors accompanied the issue of its successive volumes, which, however, at the same time multiplied his foes and stimulated their hatred.

In 1782, at Frederick the Great's invitation, he went to Berlin, where he remained for many years, in the course of which he published his Vie et régne de Frédéric II (Berlin, 1788) and La Prusse littéraire sous Frédéric II (3 vols., Berlin, 1790–1791). His Delle revoluzioni della Germania was published at Florence in 1804, in which year he went to Paris as the imperial librarian, on the invitation of Napoleon. At Paris he published in 1805 his Tableau de la Haute Italie, et des Alpes qui l'entourent. He died there in 1813.

The French politician and poet Joseph Aurèle de Bossi studied law under his direction.

Works 
Carlo Denina left a great many works, most of them in Italian, including:
1760: Discours sur les vicissitudes de la littérature;
1770: Révolutions d'Italie, 1769 et 1820 (translated by abbé Jardin from 1770) ;
1781: Histoire politique et littéraire de la Grèce ;
1788: Essai sur la vie de Frédéric II, in French ;
1790: la Prusse littéraire sous Frédéric II ;
1804: Révolutions de la Germanie ;
1805: Histoire du Piémont;
1805: la Clef des langues (in French) ;
1809: Histoire de l'Italie occidentale.

References

External links 
 Carlo Denina on Data.bnf.fr

Italian librarians
18th-century Italian historians
18th-century Italian male writers
19th-century Italian historians
19th-century Italian male writers
1731 births
1813 deaths
People from the Province of Cuneo
Members of the Prussian Academy of Sciences